The grey-collared becard (Pachyramphus major) is a species of bird in the family Tityridae. Its genus, Pachyramphus, has traditionally been placed in Cotingidae or Tyrannidae, but evidence strongly suggests it is better placed in Tityridae.

It is found in Belize, El Salvador, Guatemala, Honduras, Mexico, and Nicaragua.
Its natural habitats are subtropical or tropical dry forest, subtropical or tropical moist lowland forest, and subtropical or tropical moist montane forest.

References

grey-collared becard
Birds of Central America
Birds of Mexico
Birds of the Sierra Madre Occidental
Birds of the Sierra Madre Oriental
Birds of the Sierra Madre del Sur
Birds of the Trans-Mexican Volcanic Belt
grey-collared becard
Taxonomy articles created by Polbot